Emily "Cissy" Houston (née Drinkard; born September 30, 1933) is an American soul and gospel singer. After a successful career singing backup for such artists as Roy Hamilton, Dionne Warwick, Elvis Presley, and Aretha Franklin, Houston embarked on a solo career, winning two Grammy Awards for her work.

Houston is the mother of singer and actress Whitney Houston, the aunt of singers Dionne Warwick and Dee Dee Warwick, and a cousin of opera singer Leontyne Price.

Early life
Born Emily Drinkard in Newark, New Jersey, to Nitcholas "Nitch" Drinkard (1895-1952) and Delia Mae Drinkard (née McCaskill) (1901-1941), she was the eighth and final child; older siblings were brothers William (1918–2003), Handsome (1925–1986), Nicky (1929–1992), and Larry (1931–2012); and sisters Lee (1920–2005), Marie (1922–2007), and Anne (1927–2003).
Houston's father Nitcholas Drinkard was born to Susan Bell (called Delia) Drinkard (née Fuller), of Dutch and African-American descent. His father John Drinkard, Jr., was of Native American descent. The Drinkards had owned a substantial amount of farmland in Blakely, Georgia, at a time when it was unusual for black people to have large landholdings. The asset was gradually depleted as they sold small portions of land over time, to resolve the continued legal troubles of a close relative. 

After Houston's three oldest siblings were born, the family relocated to New Jersey during the Great Migration. Her parents emphasized the children getting educated and being involved in the church, and her father encouraged Houston and her siblings to sing. In 1938, five-year-old Cissy's mother Delia suffered a stroke and died of cerebral hemorrhage three years later. Houston's father died of stomach cancer in March 1952 when Houston was 18. Cissy went to live with her older sister Lee and her husband Mancel Warrick. The Warricks had three children: a son, Mancel Warrick Jr. and two daughters Marie Dionne Warrick and Delia Juanita (Dee Dee) Warrick. Soprano Leontyne Price is a Drinkard cousin. 

Houston attended  South Side High School.

Houston is a Christian, and has said that she "found Christ" at age 14.

Career

The Drinkard Singers
Houston's singing career began in 1938 when she joined her sister Anne and brothers Larry and Nicky in the gospel singing group the Drinkard Four. Lee (who would later become the mother of singers Marie Dionne Warrick and Delia Juanita (Dee Dee) Warrick, later joined the group along with Anne Drinkard Moss and Marie Drinkard Epps, and the group was renamed The Drinkard Singers. It was while performing on Drinkard Singers that Cissy Houston made her television debut on TV Gospel Time. Houston and the Drinkard Singers regularly performed at New Hope Baptist Church and later recorded a live album for RCA called A Joyful Noise, becoming one of the first gospel acts to release a gospel album on a major label. The Drinkard Singers also earned success performing at Carnegie Hall and the Newport Jazz Festival.

Sweet Inspirations
In 1963, then about to give birth to daughter Whitney Houston, she formed the Sweet Inspirations with Doris Troy and niece Dee Dee Warwick. Later, under contract to Atlantic Records, Sylvia Shemwell, Estelle Brown and Myrna Smith form the line-up. During the mid-1960s, the Sweet Inspirations provided backup vocals for a variety of artists, including Otis Redding, Wilson Pickett, Lou Rawls, The Drifters, Dusty Springfield, and Houston's niece Dionne Warwick. They appeared on Van Morrison's single "Brown Eyed Girl". Houston performed the operatic soprano descant on the Aretha Franklin hit "Ain't No Way". In 1967, The Sweet Inspirations sang background vocals for The Jimi Hendrix Experience on the track "Burning of the Midnight Lamp".

In 1969, they were hired to sing backing vocals for American singer Elvis Presley in Las Vegas on his return to live performances during July and August 1969. Presley often introduced them at shows by saying, "They really live up to their name, ladies & gentlemen: The Sweet Inspirations!"  Many of these performances can be heard on the All Shook Up and Live In Las Vegas live records. Performing with Elvis Presley was Houston's final gig with The Sweet Inspirations. As her children were growing bigger, she decided to stop touring and focus on her career as a recording artist.

Solo career
As Cecily Blair she cut her first secular solo record "This Is My Vow" on M'n'M Records in 1963 following this up in 1966 with "Bring Him Back" b/w "World Of Broken Hearts" on Congress. Her final solo single before recording with The Sweet Inspirations was "Don't Come Running To Me" b/w "One Broken Heart For Sale" released on Kapp Records in 1967. On these early singles her name is spelled as Sissie Houston. In 1969, Houston signed a recording contract with Commonwealth United Records and recorded her solo debut LP Presenting Cissy Houston which was released in 1970.  It contained several well received singles, including covers of "I'll Be There" and "Be My Baby", both of which made the R&B charts.

Following the release of her debut album, Houston's contract was sold to Janus Records in 1970. She recorded another album and several more singles in the early 1970s, which included the original recording of Jim Weatherly's "Midnight Train to Georgia" in 1972, later a number one hit for Gladys Knight & The Pips. She continued to record with Janus Records until 1975.

In 1977, Houston was signed by Private Stock Records, working with arranger/producer Michael Zager on three albums. The second included her big disco hit "Think It Over", which climbed to No. 32 on the Billboard R&B chart in 1979. She represented USA at the World Popular Song Festival in 1979 with a track called "You're the Fire", landing second place and winning the "Most Outstanding Performance Award". This also appeared on her 1980 disco-flavored album, Step Aside for a Lady, again produced by Zager, but released on Columbia Records (on EMI in the United Kingdom).

Session musician

Houston's versatile cross-genre singing style has kept her highly in demand as a session musician with some of the world's most successful recording artists. Houston, along with Dionne Warwick and Dee Dee Warwick, sang the background vocals on the original recording of Time Is On My Side by Kai Winding, released by Verve Records in October 1963. She was one of the backup singers on the Paul Simon song "Mother and Child Reunion" (1972)

Houston sang back-up on Bette Midler's 1972 debut album, The Divine Miss M. In 1974, Houston sang back-up on Linda Ronstadt's multi-Platinum Heart Like A Wheel, a seminal album that topped Billboard′s Pop and Country Album Charts in early 1975. In 1971, Houston was featured on three tracks of Burt Bacharach's self-titled solo album: "Mexican Divorce", "All Kinds of People" and "One Less Bell to Answer". During 1975 and 1976, she worked with jazz flutist Herbie Mann on three Atlantic albums, Discothèque, Waterbed and Surprises, featuring on three tracks, "Violet Don't Be Blue", JJ Cale's "Cajun Moon" and "Easter Rising". In addition to her work as choirmaster at New Hope Baptist Church in Newark, NJ, Cissy performed frequently at clubs in NYC including Mikell's, Sweetwaters, Seventh Avenue South, and Fat Tuesday from the late 1970s through the 1980s. Whitney Houston, her daughter and backup singer, increasingly sang solos with Cissy's band. They would collaborate on "Ain't No Way" (originally a Cissy Houston and Aretha Franklin vehicle), on which Cissy sang herself and Whitney sang "Aretha".

Gospel soloist and duets
In 1996, Houston received the Grammy Award for Best Traditional Soul Gospel Album for Face to Face, an album that contained a Gospel version of "How Sweet It Is (To Be Loved by You)". The same year, she contributed one song to the gospel soundtrack album for the film The Preacher's Wife, which starred her daughter Whitney Houston. In 1998, she won her second Grammy for her album He Leadeth Me. She has also continued to record infrequent secular material and in 1987, Houston and her daughter Whitney recorded a duet titled "I Know Him So Well", a cover of the original by Barbara Dickson and Elaine Paige from the Broadway show, Chess. This song also became a single in early 1989 as the 6th and last single release (in selected European countries) from Whitney's album Whitney. In 1992 she teamed up with Chuck Jackson for an album of solo and duet recordings entitled I'll Take Care of You.

In 2006, she recorded the song "Family First" with niece Dionne Warwick and daughter Whitney Houston for the soundtrack to the movie Daddy's Little Girls. In 2010, Cissy attended the third annual BET Honors with her daughter Whitney, who received the entertainment award. In 2012, Cissy performed "Bridge over Troubled Water" at the tribute for her daughter at the BET Music Awards. On September 29, 2014, at 80 years old,  Cissy sang backup to a standing-ovation performance with Aretha Franklin of  Adele's "Rolling in the Deep", and "Ain't No Mountain High Enough" on The Late Show with David Letterman.

New Hope Baptist Church Youth Inspirational Choir
For more than fifty years, Houston has led the 200-member Youth Inspirational Choir at the New Hope Baptist Church (Newark). She is a driving force behind and performs annually at the McDonald's Gospelfest.

Personal life
In 1955, Houston married Freddie Garland and had a son, Gary Garland (born October 12, 1957), an NBA basketball player and DePaul University Athletic Hall of Famer.

In the spring of 1957, when she was 24, Houston met John Russell Houston Jr. and embarked on a romance that led to the births of son Michael (born August 14, 1961), a songwriter and road manager, and daughter Whitney (August 9, 1963 - February 11, 2012), who went on to be a world-renowned singer, actress and entertainer. During the early years of the relationship, John was still married to his first wife, Elsie Hamilton. After Houston's first marriage ended in divorce in April 1964, Cissy and John married the following month. John Houston Jr. was a former Army veteran who served his country during World War II and was working as a taxi and truck driver when he met Cissy. He first entered the entertainment business managing his nieces-in-law's vocal group, the Gospelaires, in 1959. After his wife formed The Sweet Inspirations, he served as their manager until Cissy left the group in 1969 to start her solo career. After John survived a near-fatal heart attack in 1976, John and Cissy's marriage turned volatile and by 1977, they agreed to legally separate, though they remained married until 1991. Houston has six grandchildren and nine great-grandchildren.

In the late 1990s, when her daughter Whitney began to struggle with drug addiction, Cissy staged several interventions to get her into rehabilitation programs. On one occasion she obtained a court order and the assistance of two sheriffs to intervene, persuading Whitney to undertake treatment at Hope For Women Residential & Therapeutic Services in Atlanta, Georgia. In her 2013 book, Remembering Whitney: My Story of Love, Loss, and the Night the Music Stopped, Cissy described a scene she encountered during a visit to Whitney and then-husband Bobby Brown's home in 2005 where she saw the walls and door painted with big glaring eyes and strange faces. After having seen what she thought was several disturbing scenes, this led Cissy to return with law enforcement and perform an intervention. Whitney would attend recovery and rehabilitation programs. 

On February 11, 2012, Whitney Houston died at the Beverly Hilton Hotel in Beverly Hills, California. After her daughter's death, Cissy expressed her distaste for the media's coverage of related events: "The media are awful. People have come from here and there, [and they] don't know what they're talking about," she said. "People I haven't seen in 20 years ... Here they come, [they] think they know everything, but that's not true. But God has His way of taking care of all of it, and I'm glad I know that.

Discography

With the Drinkard Singers

With the Sweet Inspirations
See Sweet Inspirations Discography

Solo

Compilations

Collaborations

Soundtracks

Backing vocals

Musical arrangements

Musical compositions

Filmography

Film
1978: The Wiz (uncredited voice) – The Wiz Singers Adult Choir
1984: Taking My Turn (TV)
1994: The Vernon Johns Story (TV) as Rose
 aka Freedom Road: The Vernon Johns Story (UK)
 aka The Road to Freedom: The Vernon Johns Story (USA: alternative title)
1996: The Preacher's Wife as Mrs. Havergal
2018: God's Not Dead: A Light in Darkness
2018: Whitney

Television
1970: The Tonight Show Starring Johnny Carson (3 episodes)
1979: Gangsters (herself)
 aka Hoodlums (USA: video title)
1985: Late Night with David Letterman; August 28 episode
1986: Ebony/Jet Showcase; October 10 episode
1987: The 1st Annual Soul Train Music Awards
1988: The 15th Annual American Music Awards
1992: Whitney Houston: This Is My Life
1997: Classic Whitney: Live from Washington, D.C.
1998: Late Show with David Letterman December 23 episode
2001: BET Awards
2004: Intimate Portrait Dionne Warwick episode
2008: This Time (herself)
2012: BET Awards
2013: Oprah's Last Chapter
2013: The Houstons: On Our Own

References

External links

Cissy Houston @ Artist Direct
Cissy Houston's oral history video excerpts at The National Visionary Leadership Project
The New Hope Baptist Church
 Live Performance with David Bowie

1933 births
A&M Records artists
African-American Christians
African-American women singers
American disco musicians
American gospel singers
American people of Dutch descent
American soul singers
20th-century American singers
21st-century American singers
Baptists from New Jersey
Columbia Records artists
Grammy Award winners
Living people
Malcolm X Shabazz High School alumni
Motown artists
Participants in American reality television series
Musicians from Newark, New Jersey
RCA Records artists
Singers from New Jersey
American sopranos
20th-century American women singers
Culture of Newark, New Jersey
21st-century American women singers
Private Stock Records artists
The Sweet Inspirations members
The Drinkard Singers members